David Erskine, Lord Dun (1670–1758), 13th Laird of Dun, was a Scottish advocate, judge and commissioner to parliament.

Erskine, son of David Erskine of Dun, near Montrose, in Angus, studied at the universities of St. Andrews and Paris. He became a member of the Faculty of Advocates on 19 November 1698, and soon rose to eminence. He represented Forfarshire at the convention of estates, 1689, and in the parliaments of 1690, 1691, 1693, 1695, and 1696, and opposed the union.

In November 1710 he took his seat as an ordinary lord by the title of Lord Dun, and on 13 April 1714 was also appointed a lord of justiciary. He resigned his justiciary gown in 1744 and his office as an ordinary lord in 1753, and died 26 May 1758 in the eighty-fifth year of his age.

He is author of a little volume entitled 'Lord Dun's Friendly and Familiar Advices adapted to the various Stations and Conditions of Life,’ 12mo, Edinburgh, 1754. His arguments on the doctrine of passive obedience were assailed the same year by Dr. Robert Wallace, minister at Moffat, who characterises Erskine as 'a venerable old man, of very great experience, and greatly distinguished for piety.'

See also
 James Erskine, Lord Grange

References

1670 births
1758 deaths
People from Montrose, Angus
Alumni of the University of St Andrews
University of Paris alumni
18th-century Scottish writers
Dun
Members of the Faculty of Advocates
Shire Commissioners to the Parliament of Scotland
Members of the Convention of the Estates of Scotland 1689
Members of the Parliament of Scotland 1689–1702
Politics of Angus, Scotland
18th-century Scottish judges
Kingdom of Scotland expatriates in France